Haywood Knowles Nelson Jr. (born March 25, 1960) is an American actor.  He is best known for having portrayed Dwayne Nelson in the television series What's Happening!!, which aired from 1976 to 1979, as well as in its spin-off series What's Happening Now!!, from 1985 to 1988.

Biography
Haywood Nelson has been a member of the entertainment community for over forty years. Born in New York, he began his career at the age of six with numerous principle on-camera and voice-over national commercials, including Lavoris, Campbell's Soup, Libby's, Polaroid, Hot Wheels, Rock'em Sock'em Robots, Johnny Lightening, Aurora AFX, Kodak, Duncan Hines, Milk, Burger King, and Dean Witter.

Nelson appeared as a co-star in several feature films, including If You Give a Dance, You Gotta Pay the Band, Mixed Company , This Property Is Condemned, and a featuring role in Evilspeak.  Haywood also spent a two-year run on Broadway in Thieves. Nelson guest starred on Kojak in the episode "The Godson" as Bobby Moore. At the age of 14, he went on to guest star in the television series Sanford and Son as the grandson of Whitman Mayo's Grady then acting in the series of the same name, Grady in 1975. The next year, in 1976, at the age of 16, Haywood soon landed the role of "Dwayne" in the television series "Cooley High," which became the ABC hit series "What's Happening!" for TOY Productions. As a "teenage heartthrob" on a popular television series, Nelson was one of the first Black teen idols. After threes seasons Nelson went on to a short run on the television series The White Shadow for MTM Enterprises. Haywood had his studies in Architectural Design and Electronics Engineering interrupted when the cast of What's Happening!! was re-united for three seasons of syndication in the series continuation What's Happening Now!! for Columbia Pictures Television where he also observed as Technical Director. Later Haywood appeared in an urban dramatic Broadway production at New York's Lincoln Center Alice Tully Hall, appeared As Himself in the Paramount film Dickie Roberts and a role on The Parkers.

He is a devout Scientologist.

Filmography

References

External links
 
 Haywood Nelson on the cover of Right On! magazine, February 1977.
 Ebony, Vol. Vol. 33, No. 8 (June 1978), p. 82.
Interview with Haywood "Dwayne" Nelson, 1998-11-01, In Black America; KUT Radio, American Archive of Public Broadcasting (WGBH and the Library of Congress)

1960 births
Living people
Male actors from New York City
American male child actors
American male television actors
American male film actors
American male stage actors
American Scientologists
African-American male child actors
21st-century African-American people
20th-century African-American people